Mysliv or Myslív may refer to:

Myslív, a municipality and village in the Czech Republic
Mysliv, a village in Kalush Raion, Ukraine